The 2019–20 Indian Super League playoffs was sixth playoffs series in the Indian Super League, one of the top Indian professional football leagues. The playoffs began in March 2020 and concluded with the final in March 2020 in Goa.

The top four teams from the 2019–20 ISL regular season had qualified for the playoffs. The semi-finals took place over two legs while the final was a one-off match at the Fatorda Stadium.

Season table

Teams
 FC Goa
 ATK
 Bengaluru FC
 Chennaiyin FC

Playoffs Stage

Bracket

Semi-finals

|}

Leg 1

Leg 2

Chennaiyin won 6–5 on aggregate

ATK won 3–2 on aggregate

Final
Owing to COVID-19 pandemic in India the final was played behind closed doors.

References

2019–20 Indian Super League season